Robert F. Spangler (September 8, 1917 – March 31, 1992) was an American football and basketball player and coach. Following a successful played career as a quarterback at Duke University, he served as the head football coach at Atlantic Christian College—now known as Barton College—in Wilson, North Carolina from 1947 to 1948 and Catawba College in Salisbury, North Carolina from 1949 to 1952.

Head coaching record

College football

References

External links
 

1917 births
1992 deaths
American football quarterbacks
Barton Bulldogs football coaches
Catawba Indians football coaches
Catawba Indians men's basketball coaches
Duke Blue Devils football players
Duke Blue Devils men's basketball players
High school football coaches in Virginia